Domene miranda is a species of rove beetles first found in Turkey.

References

Further reading
Assing, V., and B. Feldmann. "On Domene scabripennis ROUGEMONT and its close relatives (Coleoptera: Staphylinidae: Paederinae)." Linzer Biologische Beiträge 46.1 (2014): 499–514.

Beetles described in 2010
Paederinae
Invertebrates of Turkey